Knútur (also known as Knúkur) is marginally the highest point of Skúvoy in the central Faroe Islands. Located on the western side of the island, the hill has a height of 392 or 393 metres.  Heyggjurin Mikli towards the south of Skúvoy is marginally lower at 391 metres.

References

Mountains of the Faroe Islands